Jessheim Stadion (previously called UKI Arena for sponsorship reasons) is a football stadium located at Jessheim in Ullensaker, Norway. Opened in August 2011, it is home of the First Division side Ullensaker/Kisa IL (Ull/Kisa). The venue consists of an all-seater grandstand with 1,130 under-roof seats on the one long side and a media center on the other side. One of the stands on the short sides has a roof, the other has not. The pitch has artificial turf and the dimensions .

17 November 2015, Ull/Kisa's board decided that the arena would change its name from UKI Arena to Jessheim Stadion ahead of the 2016 season.

Average attendances
This shows the average attendance on Ull/Kisa's home games in the league since the opening of Jessheim Stadion in 2012.

External links
 Jessheim Stadion - Nordic Stadiums

References

Football venues in Norway
Sports venues in Viken
Ullensaker
Sports venues completed in 2011
2011 establishments in Norway
Ullensaker/Kisa IL